West Yorkshire is a metropolitan county in the Yorkshire and the Humber region of England. Created as a metropolitan county in 1974 after the passage of the Local Government Act 1972, it consists of five metropolitan boroughs, namely the City of Bradford, Calderdale, Kirklees, the City of Leeds and the City of Wakefield.
Its area corresponds approximately with the historic West Riding of Yorkshire, and it contains the major towns of Bradford, Dewsbury, Halifax, Huddersfield, Leeds, and Wakefield.

In England, buildings are given listed building status by the Secretary of State for Culture, Media and Sport, acting on the recommendation of English Heritage.  This gives the structure national recognition and protection against alteration or demolition without authorisation.  Grade I listed buildings are defined as being of "exceptional interest, sometimes considered to be internationally important"; only 2.5 per cent of listed buildings are included in this grade. This is a complete list of Grade I listed ecclesiastical buildings, including cathedrals, churches and chapels, in West Yorkshire as recorded in the National Heritage List for England.

Christian churches have existed in West Yorkshire since the Anglo-Saxon era, and two of the churches in the list have retained elements of Anglo-Saxon architecture, namely All Hallows, Bardsey, and All Saints, Ledsham.  Surviving Norman architecture is found in particular in St John the Baptist, Adel, St Oswald, Guiseley,  and St Mary, Kippax.   Most of the remaining churches in this list are in the Gothic style, dating between the 13th and the 17th centuries.  There are four buildings in the list that are largely Neoclassical in style, namely the chapel in Bramham Park, St Peter and St Leonard, Horbury, Holy Trinity, Leeds, and St Peter, Sowerby.  Churches built in the 19th century, and in Gothic Revival style, are All Souls, Halifax, St Peter, Leeds, St Saviour, Leeds, and Todmorden Unitarian Church.  Also in the list are the Italianate Congregational Church in Saltaire, and, in Modern style, Epiphany Church in Gipton, Leeds.  Almost all the churches are part of the Anglican denomination, the exceptions being the Congregational Church in Saltaire, Todmorden Unitarian Church, the Puritan Chapel in Bramhope, and Fulneck Moravian Chapel.

Churches

References
Citations

Sources

 
West Yorkshire
 
 
Churches